The 1926 DePaul Blue Demons football team was an American football team that represented DePaul University as an independent during the 1926 college football season. In its second season under head coach Eddie Anderson, the team compiled a 3–3 record and outscored opponents by a total of 83 to 63.

Schedule

References

DePaul
DePaul Blue Demons football seasons
DePaul Blue Demons football